Shamsul Mulk, Ph.D., HI, is a Pakistani civil engineer and a Technocrat. Shamsul Mulk also served as the 24th Chief Minister of the Khyber-Pakhtunkhwa Province under the Military Government of Chief of Army Staff General Pervez Musharraf. He also served as Chairman Water and Power Development Authority WAPDA of Pakistan. He was 3rd Chairperson of Board of Governors of Sustainable Development Policy Institute. He is a strong supporter for the construction of the Kalabagh Dam.

Views on Kalabagh Dam 
He is considered as the most hardline supporter of Kalabagh Dam. He has indicated inter provinces prejudices as well as alleged foreign lobbies supporting anti-Kalabag dam movement in Sindh and Khyber Pakhtunkhwa.
He also argued that the worst floods in Noshera history in 1929 and 2010 flooded Noshera which denies the ANP fears of Noshera being flooded on construction of Kalabagh Dam.

External links 
Khyber-Pakhtunkhwa Provincial government
Shamsul Mulk was the third Chairperson of SDPI Board of Governors
WAPDA homepgae

Chief Ministers of Khyber Pakhtunkhwa
Living people
Pakistani scientists
Sustainability advocates
Year of birth missing (living people)
University of Engineering & Technology, Peshawar alumni
Chairman of the Water & Power Development Authority